Aamako Ghar ("Mother's House," established 1999) is a non-profit organisation established to shelter homeless senior citizens and children of Nepal. It was founded by Dil Shova Shrestha.

References

Child-related organisations in Nepal
Non-profit organisations based in Nepal
1999 establishments in Nepal